The Tavern at Old Church is a historic 19th-century tavern complex at 3350-3360 Old Church Road east of Mechanicsville, Virginia in the hamlet of Old Church.  The property includes a Federal-era tavern building built in two stages, a wood-frame structure built about 1820, and an attached brick structure built by 1830.  Also included on the property are a suite of period outbuildings, a particular rarity for surviving rural 19th-century taverns in Virginia.

The property was listed on the National Register of Historic Places in 2016.

See also
National Register of Historic Places listings in Hanover County, Virginia

References

Federal architecture in Virginia
Buildings and structures completed in 1820
Buildings and structures in Hanover County, Virginia
National Register of Historic Places in Hanover County, Virginia